DigiSync is a hardware device developed by Filmlab Systems International to allow negative cutters, telecine machines, and ColorMaster to read and log keykode data from motion picture film. It can also be used to capture KeyCode and change emulsion settings on Hollywood Film Company color film analyzers.

References

External links
 Official Site of DigiSync

Film production
Film and video technology